William McMath (1881 – 5 December 1920) was a New Zealand cricketer. He played three first-class matches for Auckland between 1917 and 1919. McMath died in hospital the day after being run over by a tram in the Auckland suburb of Takapuna. He left a widow and a young family.

See also
 List of Auckland representative cricketers

References

External links
 

1881 births
1920 deaths
New Zealand cricketers
Auckland cricketers
Road incident deaths in New Zealand